The Aphrodite of Knidos (or Cnidus) was an Ancient Greek sculpture of the goddess Aphrodite created by Praxiteles of Athens around the 4th century BC.  It is one of the first life-sized representations of the nude female form in Greek history, displaying an alternative idea to male heroic nudity. Praxiteles' Aphrodite is shown nude, reaching for a bath towel while covering her pubis, which, in turn leaves her breasts exposed. Up until this point, Greek sculpture had been dominated by male nude figures.  The original Greek sculpture is no longer in existence; however, many Roman copies survive of this influential work of art. Variants of the Venus Pudica (suggesting an action to cover the breasts) are the Venus de' Medici and the Capitoline Venus.

Original

The Aphrodite of Knidos was commissioned as the cult statue for the Temple of Aphrodite at Knidos. It depicted the goddess Aphrodite as she prepared for the ritual bath that restored her purity, discarding her drapery with one hand, while modestly shielding herself with the other. The placement of her hands obscures her pubic area, while simultaneously drawing attention to her exposed upper body. The statue is famed for its beauty, and is designed to be appreciated from every angle.

Because the various copies show different body shapes, poses and accessories, the original can only be described in general terms; the body twisting in a contrapposto position, with the head probably turned to the left. Lucian said that she "wore a slight smile that just revealed her teeth", although most later copies do not preserve this.

The female nude appeared nearly three centuries after the earliest nude male counterparts in Greek sculpture, the kouros; the female kore figures were clothed. Previously nudity was a heroic uniform assigned only to men.  When making the Aphrodite of Knidos, Spivey argues that her iconography can be attributed to Praxiteles creating the statue for the intent of being viewed by male onlookers. Overwhelming evidence from aggregations suggests that the Knidian sculpture was meant to evoke male responses of sexuality upon viewing the statue, which were said to have been encouraged by the temple staff. The Aphrodite of Knidos established a canon for the proportions of the female nude, and inspired many copies, the best of which is considered to be the Colonna Knidia in the Vatican's Pio-Clementine Museum. A Roman copy, it is not thought to match the polished beauty of the original, which was destroyed in a disastrous fire at Constantinople in CE 475. According to an account by Pliny the Elder, Praxiteles sculpted both a nude and a draped statue of Aphrodite. The city of Kos purchased the draped statue, because they felt the nude version was indecent and reflected poorly on their city, while the city of Knidos purchased the nude statue. Pliny claims that it brought fame to Knidos and coins issued there depicting the statue seem to confirm this.

Praxiteles was alleged to have used the courtesan Phryne as a model for the statue, which added to the gossip surrounding its origin.  The statue became so widely known and copied that in a humorous anecdote the goddess Aphrodite herself came to Knidos to see it. A lyric epigram of Antipater of Sidon places a hypothetical question on the lips of the goddess herself:
<blockquote><poem>
Paris, Adonis, and Anchises saw me naked, Those
are all I know of, but how did Praxiteles contrive it?</poem></blockquote>

A similar epigram is attributed to Plato:

According to an epigram from Roman poet Ausonius, Praxiteles never saw what he was not meant to see, but instead sculpted Aphrodite as Ares would have wanted.

 Temple in Knidos 

The statue became a tourist attraction in spite of being a cult image, and a patron of the Knidians. Nicomedes I of Bithynia offered to pay off the enormous debts of the city of Knidos in exchange for the statue, but the Knidians rejected his offer. The statue would have been polychromed, and was so lifelike that it even aroused men sexually, as witnessed by the tradition that a young man broke into the temple at night and attempted to copulate with the statue, leaving a stain on it. An attendant priestess told visitors that upon being discovered, he was so ashamed that he hurled himself over a cliff near the edge of the temple. This story is recorded in the dialogue Erotes (section 15), traditionally attributed to Lucian of Samosata, which offers the fullest literary description of the temenos of Aphrodite at Knidos. 
The floor of the court had not been doomed to sterility by a stone pavement, but on the contrary, it burst with fertility, as behooves Aphrodite: fruit trees with verdant foliage rose to prodigious heights, their limbs weaving a lofty vault. The myrtle, beloved by the goddess, reached up its berry-laden branches no less than the other trees which so gracefully stretched out. They never know foliage grown old, their boughs always being thick with leaves. To tell the truth, you can notice among them some infertile trees, but they have beauty as their fruit. Such were the cypress and the planes which towered to the heavens, as well as the tree of Daphnis, who once fled Aphrodite but now has come here to seek refuge. Ivies entwine themselves lovingly around each of these trees. Heavy clusters of grapes hang from the gnarled vines: indeed, Aphrodite is only more attractive when united with Bacchus; their pleasures are sweeter for being mixed together. Apart, they have less spice. Under the welcome shade of the boughs, comfortable beds await the celebrants— actually the better people of the town only rarely frequent these green halls, but the common crowds jostle there on festive days, to yield publicly to the joys of love. (Pseudo-Lucian, Erotes)

Of the Aphrodite herself, the narrator resorts to hyperbole:
When we had exhausted the charms of these places we pressed on into the temple itself. The goddess stands in the center; her statue made of marble from Paros. Her lips are slightly parted by a lofty smile. Nothing hides her beauty, which is entirely exposed, other than a furtive hand veiling her modesty. The art of the sculptor has succeeded so well that it seems the marble has shed its hardness to mold the grace of her limbs (Pseudo-Lucian, Erotes)

Influence
The Knidian Aphrodite has not survived.  Possibly the statue was removed to Constantinople (modern Istanbul), where it was housed in the Palace of Lausus; in 475, the palace burned and the statue was lost. It was one of the most widely copied statues in the ancient world, so a general idea of the appearance of the statue can be gleaned from the descriptions and replicas that have survived to the modern day.  For a time in 1969, the archaeologist Iris Love thought she had found the only surviving fragments of the original statue, which are now in storage at the British Museum.  The prevailing opinion of archaeologists is that the fragment in question is not of the Knidia, but of a different statue.

Probably the most faithful replica of the statue is the Colonna Venus conserved in the Museo Pio-Clementino, part of the collections of the Vatican Museums.
The Kaufmann Head, found at Tralles, purchased from the C.M. Kaufmann collection, Berlin, and conserved in the Musée du Louvre, is thought to be a very faithful Roman reproduction of the head of the Knidian Aphrodite.
At Hadrian's Villa near Tivoli in Italy, there is a second-century recreation of the temple at Knidos with a fragmentary replica of the Aphrodite standing at the center of it, generally matching descriptions in ancient accounts of how the original was displayed.
 At the Prado Museum.

As well as more or less faithful copies, the Aphrodite of Knidos also influenced various variations, which include: 
the Capitoline Venus (Capitoline Museums, Rome)
the Barberini Venus
the Borghese Venus
the Venus of Arles (Louvre, Paris)
the Satala Aphrodite (British Museum), considered a replica by Zhores Khachatryan 
the Aphrodite of Melos (the Venus de Milo, Louvre, Paris)
the Venus de' Medici (Uffizi Gallery, Florence)
the Esquiline Venus (Capitoline Museum, Rome)
Venus of the Esquiline type (Louvre, Paris)
the Crouching Venus (Louvre, Paris and British Museum, London)
the Aphrodite Kallipygos (aka Venus Kalypygos, Museo Archeologico Nazionale Napoli, Naples)
the Venus Victrix (Uffizi Gallery)
Venus Urania (Uffizi Gallery)
The Mazarin Venus, named after Cardinal Mazarin (now in the J. Paul Getty Museum)
An example with added figures of Pan and Cupid at the Athens National Archaeological Museum.
The Venus Felix at the Vatican Museums, a possible variation of the type.
A relief found at Dura-Europos is believed to be the least artistically successful depiction (now in Yale University Art Gallery).

Notes

 References 

Theodor Kraus. Die Aphrodite von Knidos. Walter Dorn Verlag, Bremen/Hannover, 1957.
Leonard Closuit.  L'Aphrodite de Cnide: Etude typologique des principales répliques antiques de l'Aphrodite de Cnide de Praxitèle.  Éditions Pillet – Martigny, 1978.
Francis Haskell and Nicholas Penny.  Taste and the Antique: The Lure of Classical Sculpture, 1500–1900.  Yale University Press, New Haven/London, 1981.
Christine Mitchell Havelock.  The Aphrodite of Knidos and Her Successors: A Historical Review of the Female Nude in Greek Art University of Michigan Press, 1995.
 Cyril Mango, "Antique Statuary and the Byzantine Beholder", Dumbarton Oaks Papers 17 (1963), pp. 53–75.

 External links 
 
 Entry page for the Vatican Museums.
 James Grout: Aphrodite of Cnidus, part of the Encyclopædia Romana''

4th-century BC Greek sculptures
Sculptures by Praxiteles
Lost sculptures
 
Nude sculptures
Sculptures of Venus
Cult images